Municipal elections were held in Estonia on 20 October 2013, with advance voting between 10 and 16 October 2013. A total of 2,951 municipal council seats were up for election in 215 municipalities. The number of councillors had decreased by over 125 compared to the previous elections due to the merging of some municipalities.

The result was a victory for the Estonian Centre Party, which retained its majority in Tallinn by taking 46 of the 79 seats.

Campaign
Alongside the six major parties, 102 independent candidates and 292 citizens' elections coalitions participated in the elections.

Results

References

Local elections in Estonia
Estonia
2013 in Estonia